Princess Seungdeok was a Goryeo Royal Princess as the first and oldest daughter of King Yejong and Queen Sundeok, also the first sister of King Injong.

Biography

Early life
It seems that she was born after 1109 and was the paternal aunt of Uijong of Goryeo, Myeongjong of Goryeo and Sinjong of Goryeo. Her maternal grandfather was Yi Ja-gyeom from the powerful Incheon Yi clan. In 1124 (2nd year reign of her older brother), she was honoured as Princess Jang (장공주) and then married Wang-Gi, Count Hannam (왕기 한남백). After her death, she was posthumously honoured Princess Seungdeok (승덕공주 or 승덕궁주, 承德公主 or 承德宮主).

Husband's families
Her husband, Wang-Gi was the son of Wang-Jeong, Count Seunghwa (왕정 승화백) who was a grandson of King Jeonggan, one of King Hyeonjong's son. Gi's mother was Princess Heungsu (흥수궁주) who was actually Seungdeok' aunt. So, the princess and her husband were a cousin at least. Together, they had 3 sons.

Family
Father: Yejong of Goryeo (고려 예종; 1079–1122)
Grandfather: Sukjong of Goryeo (고려 숙종; 1054–1105)
Grandmother: Queen Myeongui of the Jeongju Yu clan (명의왕후 유씨; d. 1112)
Mother: Queen Sundeok of the Incheon Yi clan (순덕왕후 이씨; d. 1118)
Grandfather: Yi Ja-gyeom (이자겸; d. 1127)
Grandmother: Lady, of the Haeju Choe clan (부인 해주 최씨)
Older brother: Injong of Goryeo (고려 인종; 1109–1146)
Younger sister: Princess Heunggyeong (흥경공주; d. 1176)
Husband (cousin): Wang Gi, Count Hannam (왕기 한남백)
Father-in-law (formerly uncle): Wang Jeong, Count Seunghwa (왕정 승화백; d. 1130)
Mother-in-law (formerly aunt): Princess Heungsu (흥수궁주; d. 1123)
Son: Wang Seong, Marquess Sinan (왕성 신안후; d. 1178) – became the father of Queen Wondeok.
Son: Wang Bak, Count Hamnyeong (왕박 함녕백; d. 1185)
Son: Wang Pyeong, Duke Yeonchang (왕평 연창공)

References

Year of birth unknown
Year of death unknown
Goryeo princesses